In mathematics, an annulus (plural annuli or annuluses) is the region between two concentric circles. Informally, it is shaped like a ring or a hardware washer. The word "annulus" is borrowed from the Latin word anulus or annulus meaning 'little ring'. The adjectival form is annular (as in annular eclipse).

The open annulus is topologically equivalent to both the open cylinder  and the punctured plane.

Area 
The area of an annulus is the difference in the areas of the larger circle of radius  and the smaller one of radius :

The area of an annulus is determined by the length of the longest line segment within the annulus, which is the chord tangent to the inner circle,  in the accompanying diagram.

The area of an annulus sector of angle , with  measured in radians, is given by

Complex structure 
In complex analysis an annulus  in the complex plane is an open region defined as

As a subset of the complex plane, an annulus can be considered as a Riemann surface. The complex structure of an annulus depends only on the ratio . Each annulus  can be holomorphically mapped to a standard one centered at the origin and with outer radius 1 by the map

The inner radius is then .

The Hadamard three-circle theorem is a statement about the maximum value a holomorphic function may take inside an annulus.

The Joukowsky transform conformally maps an annulus onto an ellipse with a slit cut between foci.

See also

References

External links 
Annulus definition and properties With interactive animation
Area of an annulus, formula With interactive animation

Circles
Elementary geometry
Geometric shapes
Planar surfaces